Aeroporto–Guarulhos is a train station on CPTM Line 13-Jade, located in the district of Parque Cecap in Guarulhos. It has connections with the North EMTU Corridor, through Taboão Bus Terminal, and with the Governor André Franco Montoro Airport.

The station is in the left side of Rodovia Hélio Smidt and will be connected with a people mover, operated by GRU Airport, which will connect the station with terminals 1, 2 and 3.

Characteristics
Elevated station with a connection mezzanine in the lower level and two side platforms in the upper level with 8 escalators between the two levels, structure in apparent concrete with a cover of metal beams. The main access is a catwalk, which connects the station to the Terminal 1 of Guarulhos Airport. Besides the catwalk, backtracks for cars and a bus stop were built under the station, making possible the boarding and exit of passengers. The other access is in the other side of the road, for passengers from Guarulhos, and has two escalators.

References

Companhia Paulista de Trens Metropolitanos stations
Railway stations opened in 2018